Anatoly Mikhaylovich Kikin (born 3 November 1940 in Kuybyshev, now Samara; died 27 March 2012 in Samara) was a Russian football player and manager.

External links
 

1940 births
Sportspeople from Samara, Russia
2012 deaths
Soviet footballers
PFC Krylia Sovetov Samara players
FC Lada-Tolyatti players
Soviet football managers
Russian football managers
PFC Krylia Sovetov Samara managers
Russian Premier League managers
Association football forwards